Leonardo Fioravanti (born Milan, 31 January 1938) is an Italian automobile designer and CEO of Fioravanti Srl.

Career
Fioravanti studied mechanical engineering at the Politecnico di Milano, specializing in aerodynamics and car body design. He worked twenty-four years with Pininfarina, joining as a stylist in 1964, aged 26, and eventually becoming Managing Director and General Manager of Pininfarina's research arm, Pininfarina Studi & Ricerche for 18 years. 

He then joined Ferrari as a Deputy General Manager, and in 1989 moved to Fiat's Centro Stile as Director of Design.

In 1991 he left Fiat and joined Fioravanti Srl which evolved from an architecture studio to a design studio. His two sons, Matteo, an architect, and Luca, an attorney, have also worked with him at Fioravanti Srl. Fioravanti developed a number of prototype and concept cars, often displayed under his own name. In 2012 he was appointed by the Chinese automobile company BAIC Group as a design consultant. 

In 2009 Leonardo Fioravanti was elected Chairman of ANFIA Car Coachbuilders Group for a 3-year mandate from 2009 to 2011.

Octane magazine awarded Fioravanti the International Historic Motor Award Lifetime Achievement Award in 2017.

Cars designed by Fioravanti 
During his time with Pininfarina, Fioravanti designed several Ferraris: 

 Dino 206 GT and 246 GT (with Aldo Brovarone)
 Ferrari 365 GTB/4 Daytona
 Ferrari P6 Berlinetta Speciale (concept car presaging the Berlinetta Boxer)
 Ferrari 365 GT4 2+2 (the forerunner of the Ferrari 400 and Ferrari 412) 
 Ferrari 308 GTB 
 Ferrari 328
 Ferrari 512 Berlinetta Boxer 
 Ferrari 288 GTO
 Ferrari Testarossa (with Diego Ottina)
 Ferrari Mondial
 Ferrari 348 (the forerunner of the Ferrari F355)
 Ferrari 250 P5 Berlinetta Speciale
 Ferrari Pinin 

Fioravanti has designed many concept cars including:

 Alfa Romeo Vola
 BAIC C80K (2012)
 Fioravanti Hidra (2008)

References

 Edsall, Larry (September 13, 2004). "Unwavering Passion, 40 Years and Counting". AutoWeek.
 Scorah, Rob (September 2008).  "Ferrari's Four Door Fantasy". Classic Cars

External links
 Fioravanti Srl

1938 births
Living people
Italian automobile designers
Pininfarina people
Polytechnic University of Milan alumni